Cymindis balchashica is a species of ground beetle in the subfamily Harpalinae. It was described by Emetz & Kryzhanovskij in 1973.

References

balchashica
Beetles described in 1973